Mere Rang Mein Rangne Waali (translation: The one who will be colored in my colors) is an Indian youth soap opera on Life OK, produced by Rajshri Productions. Starring Samridh Bawa and Pranali Ghogare, it premiered on 17 November 2014 and went off air on 10 July 2015.

Plot 
Radha, an aspiring actress, lives in Mumbai with her family. Leeladhar (LD) belongs to a traditional family. Radha and LD always plot against each other. LD plans to prank Radha, and both of them end up trapped in an unwanted marriage.

After much persuasion, Radha agrees to stay. While LD has fallen in love with Radha, she goes with him to Mathura to compel him to sign divorce papers but he wins her over and a grand wedding ceremony is planned for them.

Radha's grandfather, Dadaji, has other plans and makes Radha sign a blank document which turns out to be a complaint by "Radha" alleging she was tortured by LD's family. On the wedding day, seeing Radha's love and concern for LD, Dadaji drops the idea of filing the complaint but Radha's uncles do not let him change his decision. The police arrive and arrest most members of LD's family.

On discovering the signed document, Radha decides to take the blame on herself to spare her grandfather being humiliated. That same day, Dadaji falls ill and is paralysed. With no one to prove her innocence, Radha is thrown out of the house by LD and his family.

One year later 
LD requests Radha to return, but hates her. Radha has become a well known actress. Actor Kabir proposes to Radha. Neha tries to get them married with the help of her brother, Abhishek, who later falls for Jahnvi. Kabir learns about LD and Radha and confronts her. LD knows about Radha's love for him. Dadaji recovers and reveals his role in the misunderstanding between Radha and LD. LD and Radha remarry with the approval of Kabir. At last, the Chaturvedis are reunited.

Cast

Main
 Samridh Bawa as Leeladhar Chaturvedi or LD
 Pranali Ghogare as Radha Pathak Chaturvedi

Recurring
 Alok Nath as Shankarnath Chaturvedi
 Mahesh Thakur as Govind Chaturvedi
 Dolly Sohi as Sadhana Chaturvedi
 Imran Zahid as Sudhakar Pathak
 Surbhi Zaveri Vyas as Suhasini Pathak
 Suchitra Bandekar as Ishaani Chaturvedi
 Amit Bhanushali as Murlidhar Chaturvedi
 Rashmi Gupta as Shamlee Chaturvedi
 Harsh Vashisht as Mohan Bhanwari Chaturvedi
 Karuna Pandey as Jayashree Chaturvedi
 Vishnu Bholwani as Himansh Pathak
 Renuka Shahne as Lawyer Renuka Deshmukh
 Akshaya Naik as Easha Deshmukh
 Dhiraj Totlani as Mukul
 Khushwant Walia as Kabir Kapoor
 Sonali Naik as Shivani
 Alefia Kapadia as Neha
 Kushabh Manghani as Abhishek

References

External links 
 Official Website on hotstar

2014 Indian television series debuts
Life OK original programming